Danapur Kuchira is a small village belongs to Kanchan Rural Municipality aka Kanchan Gaupalika ward number 1. Kuchira, actually being a part of Danapur village, is very famous for being the location of the popular Gajedi Taal. This place is developing day by day as being a popular tourist destination. 

This place used to be a part of a remote place in Nepal, but within a couple of years, we can see a lot of developments. We can see nice hotels and restaurants to attract tourists and is made more accessible by connecting this place to the East-West highway.

Populated places in Nepal